Marc Bekoff (born September 6, 1945, in Brooklyn, NY) is an American biologist, ethologist, behavioural ecologist and writer. He was a professor of Ecology and Evolutionary Biology at the University of Colorado Boulder for 32 years. He cofounded the Jane Goodall Institute of Ethologists for the Ethical Treatment of Animals, and he is Professor Emeritus of Ecology and Evolutionary Biology at the University of Colorado Boulder.

Education and academic career 
Bekoff earned a Bachelor of Arts degree from Washington University in 1967, a Master of Arts from Hofstra University in 1968, and a Ph.D. in Animal Behavior from Washington University in 1972. After completing his Ph.D., he became an assistant professor of biology at University of Missouri–St. Louis in 1973 through 1974. He went on to work at the University of Colorado Boulder as the professor of organismic biology where he pursues research into ethology, animal behavior, behavioral ecology, development and evolution of behavior, social communication and organization, animal protection, cognitive ethology, animal cognition. Bekoff retired from his active professorship after 32 years and currently holds the position of Professor Emeritus of Ecology and Evolutionary Biology at the University of Colorado Boulder. During his tenure at University of Colorado Boulder Bekoff has authored or co-authored at least 172 papers.

Writing career
After gaining his Ph.D. he began publishing articles and books on animal behavior and cognition. Bekoff authored, co-authored, or edited thousands of articles and over 30 books and encyclopedias. His articles have been published in Psychology Today, The New York Times, National Geographic, Live Science, and several more. Bekoff's books and articles try to prove that non-human animals exhibit thought processes similar to humans as well as emotions that could be compared to human emotions such as grief, fear, love, and compassion. Bekoff argues that non-human animals are extremely smart and demonstrate emotional and moral intelligences. He also has written about the grieving rituals of several different species and has recently written articles expressing his belief that non-human animals have spiritual experiences. His writings challenge his readers to rethink their relationship and responsibilities toward their fellow animals.

Activism and outreach
Bekoff is an activist that embodies non-aggressive means. His activism follows the idea that responsible assertiveness wins out over aggression any day. Since 2001, while working with Roots & Shoots, an organization founded by Jane Goodall, Bekoff has visited Boulder County Jail once a week to teach a class about animal behavior to the inmates in the jail's program for educational and life skills where he often shows movies about animal behavior and conservation. His main message is, "We should be proud to be animals, and we have so much to learn from the behavior of other animals."

Bekoff serves on the Science Advisory Board of Project Coyote which is a national non-profit organization promoting compassionate conservation and coexistence between people and wildlife through education, science, and advocacy. He is an advocate for the compassionate conservation movement which is also supported by Project Coyote. Bekoff and Goodall announced the formation of Ethologists for the Ethical Treatment of Animals (EETA) in Volume 3, 2000 issue of Journal of Applied Animal Welfare Science with its purpose being the development and maintenance of the highest ethical standards in ethological research with a focus on Cognitive ethology and animal sentience. He lectures internationally on animal behavior, cognitive ethology, and behavioral ecology, and writes a science column about animal emotion for Psychology Today.

Bekoff is a vegan. He is also a patron of the Captive Animals Protection Society. In May 2010, he argued in an article for the Greater Good Science Center, "Expanding Our Compassionate Footprint," that human beings need to abandon human exceptionalism: "Research on animal morality is blossoming, and if we can break free of theoretical prejudices, we may come to better understand ourselves and the other animals with whom we share this planet."

Selected awards
 The Exemplar Award (2000) from the Animal Behavior Society
 Animal Behavior Society Fellowship (1995)
 Guggenheim Fellowship (1980)
 The Bank One Faculty Community Service Award (2005)
 St. Francis of Assisi Award by the New Zealand SPCA (2009)
 Honorary member, Animalisti Italiani
 Honorary member, Fundacion Altarriba
 Honorary board member, Rational Animal

Bibliography

Author
 
 
 
 
 
 
 
 
 
 
 
 
 
 .

Editor

References

External links

Ethologists for the Ethical Treatment of Animals / Citizens for Responsible Animal Behavior Studies
Blog at Psychology Today

See also 
 List of animal rights advocates

1945 births
Living people
20th-century American biologists
21st-century American biologists
American columnists
American ecologists
Animal cognition writers
Animal ethicists
Animal welfare scholars
Ethologists
Hofstra University alumni
Scientists from Brooklyn
University of Colorado Boulder faculty
Washington University in St. Louis alumni
20th-century American male writers
21st-century American male writers
American science writers
American veganism activists